Xenophoridae, commonly called carrier shells, is a family of medium-sized to large sea snails,  marine gastropod mollusks in the clade Littorinimorpha.

According to the taxonomy of the Gastropoda by Bouchet & Rocroi (2005) the family Xenophoridae has no subfamilies.

Distribution
The Xenophorids live on sand and mud bottoms of the continental shelves and the continental slopes of the subtropical and tropical seas and range from very shallow water to depths of more than 1,400 meters.

Shell description
Xenophorids are unusual in that in many of the species the animal cements small stones or shells to the edge of the shell as it grows, thus the shells of those species are sometimes humorously referred to as "shell-collecting shells". The genus name Xenophora comes from two ancient Greek words and means "bearing (or carrying) foreigners".
The shells are small to rather large (diameter of base without attachments 19–160 mm; height of shell 21–100 mm), depressed to conical, with narrow to wide, simple to spinose peripheral edge or flange separating spire from base. Aperture large, base broad, rather flattened, often umbilicate. Periostracum very thin or wanting. Protoconch depressed-conical, multispiral (in one species paucispiral). Teleoconch usually with foreign objects attached in spiral series to peripheral flange and, sometimes, remainder of dorsum, at least on early whorls. Operculum horny, yellowish to brown, nucleus lateral, with simple growth lamellae, sometimes with conspicuous radial striae or hollow radial ribs.

Genera

Genera within the family Xenophoridae include:

Onustus Swainson, 1840 - synonyms: Trochotugurium Sacco, 1896; Tugurium Fischer in Kiener, 1879
Stellaria Möller, 1832 - synonym: Haliphoebus Fischer in Kiener, 1879; Xenophora (Stellaria) Schmidt, 1832
Xenophora Fischer von Waldheim, 1807 - type genus

References

External links 

 Family: Xenophoridae (Carrier Shells)